The Theory of the Leisure Class: An Economic Study of Institutions (1899), by Thorstein Veblen, is a treatise of economics and sociology, and a critique of conspicuous consumption as a function of social class and of consumerism, which are social activities derived from the social stratification of people and the division of labor; the social institutions of the feudal period (9th–15th c.) that have continued to the modern era. 

Veblen discusses how the pursuit and the possession of wealth affects human behavior, that the contemporary lords of the manor, the businessmen who own the means of production, have employed themselves in the economically unproductive practices of conspicuous consumption and conspicuous leisure, which are useless activities that contribute neither to the economy nor to the material production of the useful goods and services required for the functioning of society. Instead, it is the middle class and working class who are usefully employed in the industrialised, productive occupations that support the whole of society.

Conducted in the late 19th century, Veblen's socio-economic analyses of the business cycles and the consequent price politics of the U.S. economy, and the emergent division of labor, by technocratic speciality—scientist, engineer, technologist, etc.—proved to be accurate sociological predictions of the economic structure of an industrial society.

Background
The Theory of the Leisure Class (1899) was published during the Gilded Age (1870–1900), the time of the robber baron millionaires John D. Rockefeller, Andrew Carnegie, and Cornelius Vanderbilt, at the end of the 19th century. Veblen presents the evolutionary development of the social and economic institutions of society, wherein technology and the industrial arts are the creative forces of economic production. That in the economics of the production of goods and services, the social function of the economy was to meet the material needs of society and to earn profits for the owners of the means of production. Sociologically, that the industrial production system required the workers (men and women) to be diligent, efficient, and co-operative, whilst the owners of the factories concerned themselves with profits and with public displays of wealth; thus the contemporary socio-economic behaviours of conspicuous consumption and of conspicuous leisure survived from the predatory, barbarian past of the tribal stage of modern society.

The sociology and economics reported in The Theory of the Leisure Class show the influences of Charles Darwin and Karl Marx, Adam Smith and Herbert Spencer; thereby Veblen's socio-economic theory emphasizes social evolution and development as characteristics of human institutions. In his time, Veblen criticised contemporary (19th-century) economic theories as intellectually static and hedonistic, and that economists should take account of how people actually behave, socially, and culturally, rather than rely upon the theoretic deduction meant to explain the economic behaviours of society. As such, Veblen's reports of American political economy contradicted the (supply and demand) neoclassical economics of the 18th century, which define people as rational agents who seek utility and maximal pleasure from their economic activities; whereas Veblen's economics define people as irrational economic agents who disregard personal happiness in the continual pursuit of the social status and the prestige inherent to having a place in society (class and economic stratum). Veblen concluded that conspicuous consumption did not constitute social progress, because American economic development was unduly influenced by the static economics of the British aristocracy; therefore, conspicuous consumption was an un-American activity contrary to the country's dynamic culture of individualism.

Originally published as The Theory of the Leisure Class: An Economic Study in the Evolution of Institutions, the book arose from three articles that Veblen published in the American Journal of Sociology between 1898 and 1899: (i) "The Beginning of Ownership" (ii) "The Barbarian Status of Women", and (iii) "The Instinct of Workmanship and the Irksomeness of Labour". These works presented the major themes of economics and sociology that he later developed in works such as: The Theory of Business Enterprise (1904), about how incompatible are the pursuit of profit and the making of useful goods; and The Instinct of Workmanship and the State of the Industrial Arts (1914), about the fundamental conflict between the human predisposition to useful production and the societal institutions that waste the useful products of human effort.

Moreover, The Theory of the Leisure Class is a socio-economic treatise that resulted from Veblen's observation and perception of the United States as a society of rapidly developing economic and social institutions. Critics of his reportage about the sociology and economics of the consumer society that is the US especially disliked the satiric tone of his literary style, and said that Veblen's cultural perspective had been negatively influenced by his austere boyhood in a Norwegian American community of practical, thrifty, and utilitarian people who endured anti-immigrant prejudices in the course of integration to American society.

Thesis

Concepts 
In The Theory of the Leisure Class Veblen coined the following sociology terms:

 Leisure class — members of the upper class who are exempt from productive work.
 Pecuniary superiority — the leisure class demonstrate their economic superiority by not working.
 Pecuniary emulation — the economic effort to exceed someone else's socio-economic status.
 Pecuniary struggle — the acquisition and exhibition of wealth in order to gain social status.
 Vicarious leisure — the leisure of wives and servants as evidence of the wealth of the lord of the manor
 Estranged leisure — the leisure of servants is realised in behalf of the lord of the manor.

The stratified society 
The Theory of the Leisure Class established that the political economy of a modern society is based upon the social stratification of tribal and feudal societies, rather than upon the merit and social utility and economic utility of individual men and women. Veblen's examples indicate that many economic behaviours of contemporary society derive from corresponding tribal-society behaviours, wherein men and women practiced the division of labor according to their status group; high-status people practiced hunting and warfare, which are economically unproductive occupations, whilst low-status people practiced farming and manufacturing, which are economically productive occupations. In a socially-stratified society, the leisure class are the members of the upper class who are exempt from productive work.

(i) Occupation 
The concepts of dignity and Self-worth and Honour are the bases of the development of social class and distinctions of type among the social classes; thus, by way of social stratification, productive labor came to be seen as disreputable. Therefore, the accumulation of wealth does not confer social status, as does the evidence of wealth, such as leisure. In a stratified society, the division of labor inherent to the barbarian culture of conquest, domination, and the exploitation of labour featured labour-intensive occupations for the conquered people, and light-labour occupations for the conquerors, who thus became the leisure class. In that societal context, although low-status, productive occupations (tinker, tailor, chandler) were of greater economic value to society than were high-status, unproductive occupations (the profession of arms, the clergy, banking, etc.), for social cohesion, the leisure class occasionally performed productive work that was more symbolic than practical.

The leisure class engaged in displays of pecuniary superiority by not working and by the:

 Accumulation of property and material possessions
 Accumulation of immaterial goods — high-level education, a family crest
 Adoption of archaic social skills — manners and etiquette, chivalry and a code of conduct
 Employment of servants

(ii) Economic utility 
In exercising political control, the leisure class retained their high social-status by direct and indirect coercion, by reserving for themselves the profession of arms, and so withheld weapons and military skills from the lower social classes. Such a division of labor (economic utility) rendered the lower classes dependent upon the leisure class, which established, justified, and perpetuated the role of the leisure class as the defenders of society against natural and supernatural enemies, because the clergy also belonged to the leisure class.

Contemporary society did not psychologically supersede the tribal-stage division of labor, but evolved the division-of-labor by social status and social stratum. During the Mediæval period (5th–15th c.) only land-owning noblemen had the right to hunt and to bear arms as soldiers; status and income were parallel. Likewise, in contemporary society, skilled laborers of the working class are paid an income in wages, which is inferior to the salary income paid to the educated managers whose economic importance (as engineers, salesmen, personnel clerks, et al.) is indirectly productive; income and status are parallel.

(iii) Pecuniary emulation 
The term pecuniary emulation describes a person's economic efforts to surpass a rich person's socio-economic status. Veblen said that the pecuniary struggle to acquire and exhibit wealth, in order to gain status, is the driving force behind the development of culture and society. To attain, retain, and gain greater social status within their social class, low-status people emulate the high-status members of their socio-economic class, by consuming over-priced brands of goods and services perceived to be of better quality and thus of a higher social-class. In striving for greater social status, people buy high-status goods and services which they cannot afford, despite the availability of affordable products that are perceived as of lower quality and lesser social-prestige, and thus of a lower social-class. In a consumer society, the businessman was the latest member of the leisure class, a barbarian who used his prowess (business acumen) and competitive skills (marketing) to increase profits, by manipulating the supply and the demand among the social classes and their strata, for the same products (goods and services) at different prices.

Contemporary consumerism 

 The subjugation of women — Women originally were spoils of war captured by raiding barbarians, in contemporary society, the unemployed housewife is an economic trophy that attests to a man's socio-economic prowess. In having a wife without an independent economic life (a profession, a trade, a job) a man can display her unemployed status as a form of his conspicuous leisure and as an object of his conspicuous consumption.
 The popularity of sport — American football is sociologically advantageous to community cohesion; yet, in itself, sport is an economic side-effect of conspicuous leisure that wastes material resources.
 Devout observances — Organized religion is a type of conspicuous leisure (wasted time) and of conspicuous consumption (wasted resources); a social activity of no economic consequence, because a church is an unproductive use of land and resources, and clergy (men and women) do unproductive work.
 Social formalities — social manners are remnant barbarian behaviours, such as paying respect to one's socially powerful betters. In itself, etiquette has little value (practical or economic), but is of much social value as cultural capital, which identifies, establishes, and enforces distinctions of place (social stratum) within a social class.

Overview

Conspicuous economics 

With The Theory of the Leisure Class: An Economic Study in the Evolution of Institutions (1899), Veblen introduced, described, and explained the concepts of "conspicuous consumption" and of "conspicuous leisure" to the nascent, academic discipline of sociology. Conspicuous consumption is the application of money and material resources towards the display of a higher social-status (e.g. silver flatware, custom-made clothes, an over-sized house); and conspicuous leisure is the application of extended time to the pursuit of pleasure (physical and intellectual), such as sport and the fine arts. Therefore, such physical and intellectual pursuits display the freedom of the rich man and woman from having to work in an economically productive occupation.

Theses 
Chapter I: Introductory
The modern industrial society developed from the barbarian tribal society, which featured a leisure class supported by subordinated working classes employed in economically productive occupations. The people of the leisure class were exempted from manual work and from practicing economically productive occupations, because they belong to the leisure class.

Chapter II: Pecuniary Emulation
The emergence of a leisure class coincides with the beginning of ownership, initially based upon marriage as a form of ownership — of women and their chattel property — as evidence of prowess. As such, the material consumption of the leisure class has little to do with either comfort or subsistence, and much to do with social esteem from the community, and thus with self-respect.

Chapter III: Conspicuous Leisure
Among the lower social-classes, a man's reputation as a diligent, efficient, and productive worker is the highest form of pecuniary emulation of the leisure class available to him in society. Yet, among the social strata of the leisure class, manual labor is perceived as a sign of social and economic weakness; thus, the defining, social characteristics of the leisure class are the exemption from useful employment and the practice of conspicuous leisure as a non-productive consumption of time.

Chapter IV: Conspicuous Consumption
Theoretically, the consumption of luxury products (goods and services) is limited to the leisure class, because the working classes have other, more important, things and activities on which to spend their limited income, their wages. Yet, such is not the case, because the lower classes consume expensive alcoholic beverages and narcotic drugs. In doing so, the working classes seek to emulate the standards of life and play of the leisure class, because they are the people at the head of the social structure in point of reputability. In that emulation of the leisure class, social manners are a result of the non-productive, consumption of time by the upper social classes; thus the social utility of conspicuous consumption and of conspicuous leisure lies in their wastefulness of time and resources.

Chapter V: The Pecuniary Standard of Living
In a society of industrialised production (of goods and services), the habitual consumption of products establishes a person's standard of living; therefore, it is more difficult to do without products than it is to continually add products to one's way of life. Moreover, upon achieving self-preservation (food and shelter), the needs of conspicuous waste determine the economic and industrial improvements of society.

Chapter VI: Pecuniary Canons of Taste
To the leisure class, a material object becomes a product of conspicuous consumption when it is integrated to the canon of honorific waste, by being regarded either as beautiful or worthy of possession for itself. Consequently, to the lower classes, possessing such an object becomes an exercise in the pecuniary emulation of the leisure class. Therefore, an objet d'art made of precious metal and gemstones is a more popular possession than is an object of art made of equally beautiful, but less expensive materials, because a high price can masquerade as beauty that appeals to the sense of social prestige of the possessor-consumer.

Chapter VII: Dress as an Expression of the Pecuniary Culture
In a consumer society, the function of clothes is to define the wearer as a man or as a woman who belongs to a given social class, not for protection from the environment. Clothing also indicates that the wearer's livelihood does not depend upon economically productive labor, such as farming and manufacturing, which activities require protective clothing. Moreover, the symbolic function of clothes indicates that the wearer belongs to the leisure class, and can afford to buy new clothes when the fashion changes.

Chapter VIII: Industrial Exemption and Conservatism
A society develops through the establishment of institutions (social, governmental, economic, etc.) modified only in accordance with ideas from the past, in order to maintain societal stability. Politically, the leisure class maintain their societal dominance, by retaining out-dated aspects of the political economy; thus, their opposition to socio-economic progressivism to the degree that they consider political conservatism and political reaction as honorific features of the leisure class.

Chapter IX: The Conservation of Archaic Traits
The existence of the leisure class influences the behaviour of the individual man and woman, by way of social ambition. To rise in society, a person from a lower class emulates the characteristics of the desired upper class; he or she assumes the habits of economic consumption and social attitudes (archaic traits of demeanour in speech, dress, and manners). In pursuit of social advancement, and concomitant social prestige, the man and the woman who rid themselves of scruple and honesty will more readily rise into a stratum of the leisure class.

Chapter X: Modern Survivals of Prowess
As owners of the means of production, the leisure class benefit from, but do not work in, the industrial community, and do not materially contribute to the commonweal (the welfare of the public) but do consume the goods and services produced by the working classes. As such, the individual success (social and economic) of a person derives from his or her astuteness and ferocity, which are character traits nurtured by the pecuniary culture of the consumer society.

Chapter XI: The Belief in Luck
The belief in the concept of 'luck' (Fortuna) is one reason why people gamble; likewise follows the belief that luck is a part of achieving socio-economic success, rather than the likelier reason of social connections derived from a person's social class and social stratum. Within the social strata of the leisure class, the belief in luck is greater in the matter of sport (wherein physical prowess does matter) because of personal pride, and the concomitant social prestige; hence, gambling is a display of conspicuous consumption and of conspicuous leisure. Nonetheless, gambling (the belief in luck) is a social practice common to every social class of society.

Chapter XII: Devout Observances
The existence, function, and practice of religion in a socially-stratified society, is a form of abstract conspicuous consumption for and among the members of the person's community, of devotion to the value system that justifies the existence of his or her social class. As such, attending church services, participating in religious rites, and paying tithes, are a form of conspicuous leisure.

Chapter XIII: Survivals of the Non-invidious Interest
The clergy and the women who are members of the leisure class function as objects of vicarious leisure, thus, it is morally impossible for them to work and productively contribute to society. As such, maintaining a high social-class is more important for a woman of the leisure class, than it is for a man of the leisure class. Women, therefore, are the greatest indicators of a man's socio-economic standing in his respective community. In a consumer society, how a woman spends her time and what activities she does with her time communicate the social standing of her husband, her family, and her social class.

Chapter XIV: The Higher Learning as an Expression of the Pecuniary Culture
Education (academic, technical, religious) is a form of conspicuous leisure, because it does not directly contribute to the economy of society. Therefore, high-status, ceremonial symbols of book-learning, such as the gown and mortar-board-cap of the university graduate educated in abstract subjects (science, mathematics, philosophy, etc.) are greatly respected, whereas certificates, low-status, ceremonial symbols of practical schooling (technology, manufacturing, etc.) are not greatly respected to the same degree, because the contemporary university is a leisure-class institution.

Criticism and critique

Literary style
In The Theory of the Leisure Class, Veblen used idiosyncratic and satirical language to identify, describe, and explain the consumerist mores of American modern society in the 19th century; thus, about the impracticality of etiquette as a form of conspicuous leisure, Veblen said:

In contrast, Veblen used objective language in The Theory of Business Enterprise (1904), which analyses the business-cycle behaviours of businessmen. In his introduction to the 1973 edition, the economist John Kenneth Galbraith said that The Theory of the Leisure Class is Veblen's intellectual put-down of American society. That Veblen spoke satirically in order to soften the negative implications of his socio-economic analyses of the U.S. social-class system, facts that are more psychologically threatening to the American ego and the status quo, than the negative implications of Karl Marx's analyses. That, unlike Marx, who recognised capitalism as superior to feudalism in providing products (goods and services) for mass consumption, Veblen did not recognise that distinction, because capitalism was economic barbarism, and that goods and services produced for conspicuous consumption are fundamentally worthless.

In the Introduction to the 1967 edition of The Theory of the Leisure Class, economist Robert Lekachman said that Veblen was a misanthrope:

19th century 
The success of The Theory of the Leisure Class (1899) derived from the fidelity, veracity, and accuracy of Veblen's reportage about the socio-economic behaviours of the American system of social classes. Additional to the success (financial, academic, social) accrued to him by the book, a social-scientist colleague told Veblen that the sociology of gross consumerism catalogued in The Theory of the Leisure Class had much "fluttered the dovecotes of the East", especially in the Ivy League academic Establishment.

In the two-part book review "An Opportunity for American Fiction" (April–May 1899), the critic William Dean Howells made Veblen's treatise the handbook of sociology and economics for the American intelligentsia of the early 20th century. Reviewing first the economics and then the social satire in The Theory of the Leisure Class, Howells said that social-class anxiety impels American society to wasteful consumerism, especially the pursuit of social prestige. That despite social classes being alike in most stratified societies, the novelty of the American social-class system was that the leisure class had only recently appeared in U.S. history.

Asking for a novelist to translate into fiction what the social-scientist Veblen had reported, Howells concluded that a novel of manners was an opportunity for American fiction to accessibly communicate the satire in The Theory of the Leisure Class:    

In the Journal of Political Economy (September 1899), the book reviewer John Cummings said:
As a contribution to the general theory of sociology, Dr. Veblen's The Theory of the Leisure Class requires no other commendation for its scholarly performance than that which a casual reading of the work readily inspires. Its highly original character makes any abridgement of it exceedingly difficult and inadequate, and such an abridgement cannot be even attempted here ... The following pages, however, are devoted to a discussion of certain points of view in which the author seems, to the writer [Cummings], to have taken an incomplete survey of the facts, or to have allowed his interpretation of facts to be influenced by personal animus.

20th century 
In the essay "Prof. Veblen" (1919) the intellectual H. L. Mencken addressed the matters of Americans' social psychology reported in The Theory of the Leisure Class (1899), by asking:

In the essay "The Dullest Book of The Month: Dr. Thorstein Veblen Gets the Crown of Deadly Nightshade" (1919), after addressing the content of The Theory of the Leisure Class, the book reviewer Robert Benchley addressed the subject of who are readers to whom Veblen speaks, that:the Doctor has made one big mistake, however. He has presupposed, in writing this book, the existence of a [social] class with much more leisure than any class in the world ever possessed—for, has he not counted on a certain number of readers?

The Theory of the Leisure Class, Thorstein Veblen was vindicated as a social scientist, by the sociological results of the two Middletown studies—"Middletown: A Study in Modern American Culture (1929) and "Middletown in Transition: A Study in Cultural Conflicts" (1937)—which presented empirical evidence that working-class families practiced conspicuous consumption and did without necessities (adequate food and clothing, etc.) in order to present and maintain the public appearance of being in a higher social-class.

In the Introduction to the 1934 edition, the economist Stuart Chase said that the Great Depression (1929–1941) had vindicated Veblen the economist, because The Theory of the Leisure Class had unified "the outstanding economists of the world". In the foreword to the 1953 edition, sociologist C. Wright Mills said that Veblen was "the best critic of America that America has ever produced". In the Introduction to the 1973 edition of the book, economist John Kenneth Galbraith addressed the author as subject, and said that Veblen was a man of his time, and that The Theory of the Leisure Class—published in 1899—reflected Veblen's 19th-century world view. That in his person and personality, the social scientist Veblen was neglectful of his grooming and tended to be disheveled; that he suffered social intolerance for being an intellectual and an agnostic in a society of superstitious and anti-intellectual people, and so tended to curtness with less intelligent folk.

John Dos Passos writes of Veblen in his trilogy novel USA, in the third novel (1933), The Big Money. There, as one of Passos' highly subjective portraits of historical figures throughout the trilogy, Veblen is bio-sketched in THE BITTER DRINK in about 10 pages, referring presumably in that title to the hemlock Socrates was forced to drink for his supposed crimes.  The portrait ends with these three final lines: "but his memorial remains/riveted into the language/the sharp clear prism of his mind." 

In The Worldly Philosophers: The Lives, Times, and Ideas of the Great Economic Thinkers (1953), the historian of economics Robert Heilbroner said that Veblen's socio-economic theories applied to the Gilded Age (1870–1900) of gross materialism and political corruption in the U.S. of the 19th century, but are inapplicable in 21st-century economics, because The Theory of the Leisure Class is specific to U.S. society in general, and to the society of Chicago in particular. In that vein, in "No Rest for the Wealthy" (2009), the journalist Daniel Gross said:

Nonetheless, the economy-as-organism theory of butterfly economics vindicated Thorstein Veblen as an insightful sociologist and a farsighted economist whose empirical observations have been re-stated by contemporary economists, such as Robert H. Frank, who applied Veblen's socio-economic analyses to 21st-century political economy. That Frank's analytical application of the conspicuous-consumption model to the business and economic functions of advertising explains why the lower social-classes have no upward social mobility in their societies, despite being the productive classes of their economies. About the limited social-utility and economic non-productivity of the business social-class, the businessman Warren Buffett said that non-productive financial activities, such as day trading (speculative buying-and-selling of financial securities) and arbitrage (manipulation of price-differentials among markets) have vindicated The Theory of the Leisure Class (1899), because such activities produce only capital and do not produce useful goods and services for society.

See also

 Affluenza
 Anti-consumerism
 Conspicuous consumption
 Keeping up with the Joneses
 Downshifting (lifestyle)
 Frugality
 Over-consumption
 Signalling theory
 Simple living
 Veblen good
 Feminism

References
Notes

Bibliography

  A version of this paper is available here

External links

 
 
 Reviews of The Theory of the Leisure Class
 Selective excerpts

1899 books
1899 in economics
Economics books
Economic ideologies
Institutional economics
Leisure
Non-fiction books about consumerism
Sociology books
Thorstein Veblen